The Garbage Pail Kids Movie is a 1987 film adaptation of the children's trading cards series of the same name produced, directed, and co-written by Rod Amateau. It was the last film to be directed by Amateau before his retirement in 1989 and death in 2003.

The cards were a parody of the popular Cabbage Patch Kids dolls and each card featured a character who typically had a gross habit or abnormality, or suffered a terrible fate. The film depicted seven of the Garbage Pail Kids (played by dwarf actors in animatronic costumes) interacting with society and befriending a regular boy.

The film was lambasted by critics and is widely considered to be one of the worst films ever made. It was a box-office bomb, earning just over $1.6 million on a $1 million budget.

The Garbage Pail Kids were nominated for the Golden Raspberry Award for Worst New Star, but lost to David Mendenhall for Sylvester Stallone's Over the Top, and the song "You Can Be a Garbage Pail Kid" was nominated for the Worst Original Song, but lost to George Michael's controversial hit "I Want Your Sex" from Eddie Murphy's Beverly Hills Cop II.

Plot
A garbage can spaceship is seen flying near Earth, which is then shown inside an antique shop owned by Captain Manzini. A boy named Dodger is being assaulted by four older teenage bullies in a park. Juice, the leader, steals Dodger's money and drops him in a puddle. Dodger goes to Manzini's antique shop, where he works. Manzini takes Dodger's clothes and cleans them while warning him to stay away from the garbage can. Later, Dodger sees Tangerine, Juice's girlfriend, who seems to be the most compassionate member of the group towards Dodger, and he tries to persuade her to buy something from the shop. Dodger is attracted to Tangerine and covertly smells her hair while she is distracted. The other bullies enter the shop and attempt to rough up Dodger again, but he manages to outwit them. However, during the tussle, the garbage can is knocked over and a green ooze spills out. The bullies then bring Dodger into a sewer, handcuff him to a rail, and open a pipe, pouring sewage onto him. Dodger is then saved by little mysterious people named the Garbage Pail Kids.

Manzini returns and is upset that the Garbage Pail Kids have been released from their can, but he introduces Dodger to each of them: Greaser Greg, a leather jacket-wearing greaser with a violent attitude; Messy Tessie, a girl with a constantly runny nose; Windy Winston, an insane boy who wears a Hawaiian shirt and often farts violently (on his card, he was depicted as a nervous musician); Valerie Vomit, a girl who throws up on command; Foul Phil, a whining hungry baby with halitosis who constantly asks characters if they are his "mommy" or "daddy"; Nat Nerd, an obese acne-riddled boy who dresses up like a superhero and wets his pants frequently; and Ali Gator, the group's leader, an anthropomorphic half-person/half-alligator with an appetite for human toes. Manzini explains that the kids are forbidden from going out in public, because they will be attacked by the "normies" (normal people), and that he cannot get the kids to go back into the garbage can without magic.

The next day, Dodger goes with Tangerine to a nightclub where she sells clothes she designed. Dodger behaves awkwardly when Tangerine removes her shirt to sell it. Dodger then hides when Juice shows up. Meanwhile, the Kids steal a Pepsi truck, flatten Juice's car with it, and then have a campfire in an alley with stolen food. The next morning, the Garbage Pail Kids recover from food-induced hangovers and give Dodger a jacket they sewed. The jacket impresses Tangerine, and she asks Dodger to get more clothes so she can sell them. Upon Dodger's request, the Kids increase their output after stealing a sewing machine from a non-union sweatshop, but then get bored and go out in public in disguise. They go to a theater playing Three Stooges shorts and behave obnoxiously. Ali and Winston go to a bar and get into a fight with bikers, who are soon won over by the Kids' heroics, after which they celebrate with beers. Meanwhile, Tangerine sells the clothes and begins to prepare for a fashion show based on them. She meets the Kids and though repulsed by them, realizes that she can take advantage of their designs.

On the night of the fashion show, Tangerine locks the Kids in the basement of the antique shop to prevent their escape, and soon they are captured by Juice and his gang who bring them to the State Home for the Ugly, a prison where people too ugly for society are brought and executed. Manzini and Dodger help them escape and head to the fashion show. The Garbage Pail Kids trash the fashion show and rip the clothes off the models, while Dodger gets into a fight with Juice. Juice and his gang are later arrested and it is implied that they may now finally be locked away in prison for a good while. Later that night, Tangerine apologizes to Dodger and asks to be his friend, but Dodger rejects it due to her greed. Captain Manzini tries to sing the Garbage Pail Kids' song backward to coax them back into the garbage can, but the Kids sneak out and ride stolen ATVs away to cause more havoc.

Cast
 Anthony Newley as Captain Manzini
 Mackenzie Astin as Dodger
 Katie Barberi as Tangerine
 Ron MacLachlan as Juice
 J.P. Amateau (the director's son) as Wally
 Marjory Graue as Blythe
 John Herman Shaner as Police officer
 Patty Lloyd as foster mother
 John Cade as Bartender

The Garbage Pail Kids
 Phil Fondacaro as Greaser Greg
 Jim Cummings as Greaser Greg's voice
 Debbie Lee Carrington as Valerie Vomit
 Kevin Thompson as Ali Gator
 Robert Bell as Foul Phil
 Chloe Amateau, the director's daughter, as Foul Phil's voice
 Larry Green as Nat Nerd
 Jim Cummings as Nat Nerd's voice
 Arturo Gil as Windy Winston
 Sue Rossitto as Messy Tessie
 Teri Benaron as Messy Tessie's voice

Reception

The film was lambasted by critics upon its release, and is widely considered to be one of the worst films ever made. The film holds a 0% approval rating, and an average score of 2.2/10 on Rotten Tomatoes, based on 14 reviews. Metacritic gives the film a score of 1 out of 100, based on reviews from 7 critics, indicating "overwhelming dislike". Critics disliked the film's rude humor, acting, puppetry, inappropriate moments, the appearance of the Garbage Pail Kids, nonsensical plot, and hypocritical message. Juan Carlos Coto, writing for the News/Sun-Sentinel, called the movie "one of the worst ever made". Caryn James of The New York Times called the film "too repulsive for children or adults of any age".

Akron Beacon Journal film critic Bill O'Connor, criticized the costumes in the film, as well as the message saying it merely pays "lip service" to the message that "our insistence on physical beauty, and a narrowly defined "beauty" at that, limits our understanding, cuts us off from real human beauty."

Internet critic Doug Walker in his review said that there was nothing redeemable about the film and called it "mean spirited", particularly the State Home For The Ugly, and added that the film serves to undermine its own moral. Walker also added that his mother found the film distasteful and unsuitable for children, despite the card collection's fandom among young preadolescent males. Upon viewing the film as an adult, Walker said that he agreed with his mother's assessment.

The film was also a box-office bomb, earning just over $1.6 million on a $1 million budget.

Awards and nominations

Cancelled reboot 
In 2012, it was reported that Michael Eisner's Tornante Company had plans to finance and produce the development of a feature film based on Garbage Pail Kids, as Eisner had recently purchased the Topps Trading Card company in 2007. On July 18, 2013, it was reported that the film was cancelled, due to negative reception.

See also
List of films considered the worst
List of films with a 0% rating on Rotten Tomatoes
Garbage Pail Kids (TV series, 1987)

References

External links

The Garbage Pail Kids Movie at the TCM Movie Database

The Garbage Pail Kids Movie, at How Did This Get Made?

1987 films
1980s black comedy films
1980s fantasy comedy films
1980s musical comedy films
1980s science fiction comedy films
1987 comedy films
American black comedy films
American fantasy comedy films
American musical comedy films
American science fiction comedy films
Atlantic Entertainment Group films
1980s English-language films
Films based on trading cards
Films directed by Rod Amateau
Puppet films
1980s American films